Coryphothrips is a genus of thrips in the family Phlaeothripidae.

Species
 Coryphothrips coniceps
 Coryphothrips trochiceps

References

Phlaeothripidae
Thrips
Thrips genera